Tephritis leontodontis is a species of fly in the family Tephritidae, the gall flies. It is found in the Palearctic. The larvae feed on Scorzoneroides autumnalis.

References

Tephritinae
Insects described in 1776
Taxa named by Charles De Geer
Diptera of Europe